David John Fitton  (born 10 January 1955) is a former British diplomat who served as High Commissioner to Jamaica from 2013 to 2017.

Fitton studied at Durham University. He joined the Foreign and Commonwealth Office in 1980.

Career 
Fitton initially served as a Desk Officer in the West Africa Department and then undertook a year of Japanese language training.

From 1982 to 1986 he was based at the British Embassy in Tokyo, and back in London spent two years at the European Department, followed successively by stints as Head of the India Team (1988-1990), First Secretary in New Delhi (1990-1993), Deputy Head of the Southern European Department (1993-1996), and Counsellor in Tokyo (1996-2000).

Fitton served as Deputy Head of Mission in Ankara from 2001 to 2004. He returned to Japan in 2008, where he spent the next four years as Deputy Head of Mission, before taking up the role of High Commissioner to Jamaica in June 2013.

References

Living people
British diplomats in East Asia
High Commissioners of the United Kingdom to Jamaica
Alumni of Hatfield College, Durham
1955 births
Members of HM Diplomatic Service
20th-century British diplomats